See Aston Martin DB Mark III for the road car often called "DB3"

The Aston Martin DB3 and later DB3S were sports racing cars built in the 1950s.  Although they used some DB2 parts, they were quite different, being designed specially for racing.  The original modifications were done by ex-Auto Union engineer, Eberan von Eberhorst, though others handled the later DB3S work.

DB3
The DB3 was introduced in 1951 with a 133 hp (99 kW) 2.6 L Lagonda straight-6 engine from the DB2 Vantage.  The car was unsuccessful, so a larger 2.9 L engine, producing 163 hp (122 kW), was introduced in June 1952.  The car was placed 2nd, 3rd, and 4th at Silverstone May 1952 (in 2.6 L form) that year behind a Jaguar C-Type.  The cars were forced out of Le Mans, but did claim the 9-hour race at Goodwood. 

In 1953 a DB3 driven by Parnell/Abecassis placed 2nd at the Sebring 12 Hours, the opening race in the World Sports Car Championship, behind a Cunningham CR4 and then at the second round at the Mille Miglia, Reg Parnell drove a DB3 to 5th place, the highest position ever reached by a British sports car in the Italian classic. The car was then replaced as Astons front line car by the DB3S.

Chassis numbers
In total 10 DB3s were made between 1951 and 1953, with chassis numbers from DB3/1 to DB3/10.  Cars 1 to 5 being used as works cars and cars 6 to 10 being sold as customer cars. Ended her sporting life, chassis number 1 was sold to Eric Forrest Greene in 1953; unfortunately he only used once, at the 1954 1000 km Buenos Aires. The car crashed and fired, causing the death of his pilot. After the accident, the chassis 1 was repaired and reformed, and used in competition by the son Jack.

Coupés

Several Aston Martin DB3s have received coupé style bodies over the years. Pictured left is Aston Martin DB3/7 Coupé at Silverstone Classic 2008

DB3S

The DB3S was a lighter version of the car, introduced in 1953.  It was somewhat more successful, and was produced until 1956.  

Originally two 'works' coupé versions were also built.

In 1956 the DB3S was replaced by the DBR1, which claimed victory in the 1959 24 Hours of Le Mans.

References
 

DB3
24 Hours of Le Mans race cars